This is a complete list of members of the United States House of Representatives during the 19th United States Congress listed by seniority. For the most part, representatives are ranked by the beginning of their terms in office.

As an historical article, the districts and party affiliations listed reflect those during the 19th Congress (March 4, 1825 – March 3, 1827). Seats and party affiliations on similar lists for other Congresses will be different for certain members.

This article describes the criteria for seniority in the House of Representatives and sets out the list of members by seniority. It is prepared on the basis of the interpretation of seniority applied to the House of Representatives in the current congress. In the absence of information to the contrary, it is presumed that the twenty-first-century practice is identical to the seniority customs used during the 19th Congress.

House seniority
Seniority in the House, for Congressmen with unbroken service, depends on the date on which the members first term began. That date is either the start of the Congress (4 March in odd numbered years, for the era up to and including the 73rd Congress starting in 1933) or the date of a special election during the Congress. Since many members start serving on the same day as others, ranking between them is based on alphabetical order by the last name of the congressman.

Congressmen, in early Congresses, were often elected after the legal start of the Congress. Such representatives are attributed with unbroken seniority, from the legal start of the congressional term, if they were the first person elected to a seat in a Congress. The date of the election is indicated in a note.

The seniority date is normally taken from the members entry in the Biographical Directory of the United States Congress, except where the date given is the legal start of the Congress and the actual election (for someone who was not the first person elected to the seat in that Congress) was later. The date of election is taken from United States Congressional Elections 1788-1997. In a few instances the latter work provides dates, for the start and end of terms, which correct those in the Biographical Directory.

The Biographical Directory normally uses the date of a special election, as the seniority date.  However, mostly in early Congresses, the date of the member taking his seat can be the one given. The date of the special election is mentioned in a note to the list below, when that date is not used as the seniority date by the Biographical Directory.

Representatives who returned to the House, after having previously served, are credited with service equal to one less than the total number of terms they served. When a representative has served a prior term of less than two terms (i.e. prior term minus one equals less than one), he is ranked above all others whose service begins on the same day.

Leadership
In this Congress the only formal leader was the Speaker of the House. A Speakership election was held on December 5, 1825. John W. Taylor (A-NY) was elected on the second ballot. He had previously been Speaker for the second session of the 16th Congress (1820–21).

The title Dean of the House (sometimes known, in the nineteenth century, as Father of the House) was held by the member with the longest continuous service. It was not a formal leadership position.

Standing committees
The House created its first standing committee, on April 13, 1789. There were twenty-five standing committees, listed in the rules used by the 19th Congress. During the Congress two new standing committees were created.

On December 9, 1825, a Committee on Revolutionary Pensions was set up (with a change of name to Military Pensions on December 13, 1825). The existing Committee on Pensions and Revolutionary Claims, was also renamed as the Committee on Revolutionary Claims, on December 13.

A second new standing committee, on the Territories, was named on December 13, 1823.

Committees, in this period, were normally appointed for a session at a time by the Speaker. However the resolution of March 30, 1816, which created the committees on departmental expenditures and Expenditures on Public Buildings, provided for those standing committees to be appointed for the whole Congress.

This list refers to the standing committees of the House in the 19th Congress, the year of establishment as a standing committee, the number of members assigned to the committee and the dates of appointment in each session (or if appropriate for the Congress), the end of the session (if appropriate) and its chairman. Chairmen, who were re-appointed after serving in the previous Congress, are indicated by an *.

The first session was December 5, 1825 – May 22, 1826 (169 days) and the second session was December 4, 1826 – March 3, 1827 (90 days).

Notes:-
 (a) Joseph Kent (A-MD) resigned from the House, on January 6, 1826. Mark Alexander (J-VA) became Chairman for the rest of the session.
 (b) Christopher Rankin (J-MS) died on March 14, 1826. John Scott (A-MO) became Chairman for the rest of the session.

List of representatives by seniority
A numerical rank is assigned to each of the 213 members initially elected to the 19th Congress. Other members, who were not the first person elected to a seat but who joined the House during the Congress, are not assigned a number.

Five representatives-elect were not sworn in, as they resigned (NH-al :Miller, KY-3, PA-16: Allison, SC-1, VA-5). The list below includes the representatives-elect (with name in italics), with the seniority they would have held if sworn in. James Miller of New Hampshire was elected as a Democratic-Republican candidate. As Miller never served in Congress, his allegiance at the time of the 19th Congress has not been ascertained.

Party designations, of Representatives, used in this article (except for James Miller) are A for Anti-Jacksonian (a supporter of President John Quincy Adams) and J for Jacksonian (an ally of Andrew Jackson). Territorial Delegates have not been given a party label, as the Biographical Directory does not specify a party for Delegates in this Congress. Designations used for past service, in the 4th to 18th Congresses, are (DR) for Democratic-Republican members and (F) for Federalist representatives. For the 18th Congress only, each party is further divided based upon the presidential candidates supported. The prefixes used are A- for Adams-Clay supporters, C- for the followers of Crawford and J- for the Jackson men.

See also
19th United States Congress
List of United States congressional districts
List of United States senators in the 19th Congress by seniority

References

 United States Congressional Elections 1788-1997, by Michael J. Dubin (McFarland and Company 1998)

External links
House Journal, First Forty-three Sessions of Congress
House of Representatives list of members of the 19th Congress

19
19th United States Congress